Ignazio Busca (31 August 1731 in Milan – 12 August 1803 in Rome) was an Italian cardinal and Secretary of State of the Holy See. He was the last son of Lodovico Busca, marquess of Lomagna and Bianca Arconati Visconti. he took a degree in utroque iure in 1759 at the Università La Sapienza of Rome. Relator of the Sacred Consulta and referendary of the tribunal of the Apostolic Signature, he was ordained priest on 20 August 1775. Elected titular archbishop of Emesa, he was consecrated on 17 September 1775 in Frascati, by Henry Benedict Stuart. He was apostolic nuncio in Flanders and apostolic vicar for Netherlands from 1776 to 1785 and later was governor of Rome from 1785 until 1789. Created cardinal in the consistory of 30 March 1789, he received the Galero and the title of Santa Maria della Pace on 3 August 1789. He was appointed Secretary of State by Pope Pius VI in 1796. He participated in the conclave of 1800.

1731 births
1803 deaths
Clergy from Milan
18th-century Italian cardinals
18th-century Italian historians
Italian poets
Italian male poets
Italian essayists
Cardinal Secretaries of State
Male essayists
Cardinals created by Pope Pius VI
18th-century Italian Roman Catholic archbishops